Desert sting formerly known as p2 is a smart micro munition guided by Global Positioning System and laser-guided missile, manufactured by Halcon Systems a subsidiary of EDGE Group.

Variants 

 DESERT STING (DS-5)
 DESERT STING (DS-8)
 DESERT STING (DS-16)
 DESERT STING (DS-25)

Users 
 - In 2019, Halcon signed a US$1 billion (AED3.6 billion) contract to supply Desert Sting-16 (DS-16) to United Arab Emirates armed forces. Also in 2021 Halon signed with UAE to deliver Thunder system and Desert Sting to the armed forces worth of $880 million (AED3.2 billion).

References 




Guided bombs